The autoroute system is a network of freeways within the province of Quebec, Canada, operating under the same principle of controlled access as the Interstate Highway System in the United States and the 400-series highways in neighbouring Ontario. The Autoroutes are the backbone of Quebec's highway system, spanning almost .

The word autoroute is a blend of auto and route, equivalent to "freeway" or "motorway" in English, and it became the equivalent of "expressway" in French. In the 1950s, when the first Autoroutes were being planned, the design documents called them autostrades from the Italian word autostrada.

Signage

Autoroutes are identified by blue-and-red shields, similar to the American Interstate system. The red header of the shield contains a white image representing a highway overpass, and the blue lower portion of the shield contains the Autoroute's number in white, along with a fleur-de-lis, which is a provincial symbol of Quebec.

Most Autoroute and road traffic signs in the province are in French, though English is also used on federally-financed or -owned routes, such as the Bonaventure Expressway in Montreal. To surmount the language barrier, however, most signs in Quebec use pictograms and text is avoided in most cases, with the exceptions usually only being the names of control cities. Other exceptions that are posted in both languages is the illegal use of radar detectors when entering the province that reads "DÉTECTEURS DE RADAR INTERDITS/RADAR DETECTORS PROHIBITED", as well as areas where roads can be slippery due to melting ice and snow, marked "DEGEL/THAW".

Numbering system

Autoroutes are divided into three types – principal routes, deviation routes, and collector routes – and are laid out and numbered in a fashion similar to the Interstate Highway System in the United States. The principal Autoroutes are the major highways of the province, and have single- or double-digit numbers. East-west Autoroutes running parallel to the Saint Lawrence River (for example, Autoroute 20 and Autoroute 40) are assigned even numbers, while north-south Autoroutes running perpendicular to the Saint Lawrence (such as Autoroute 5 and Autoroute 15) are given odd numbers. Deviation and collector Autoroutes both feature triple-digit numbers. Deviation routes are bypasses intended for truck traffic to circumvent urban areas, and are identified by an even number prefixing the number of the nearby Autoroute that it bypasses (for example, Autoroute 440 in Laval). Collector Autoroutes, by contrast, are spur routes into urban areas, and are identified by an odd number prefixing the number of the nearby Autoroute that it branches off of (such as Autoroute 720, a spur of Autoroute 20 into downtown Montreal).

History
Quebec's first Autoroute was the Autoroute des Laurentides (Laurentian Autoroute), which opened in 1959 as a toll road. This initiative to bring freeways into Quebec was started by Maurice Duplessis, whose government saw the construction of the Laurentian Autoroute (now A-15) from Montreal to Saint-Jérôme and the first section of the Boulevard Métropolitain (A-40), which opened in 1960.

1960s

It was the Quebec Liberal government of the 1960s that saw the construction of further Autoroutes, with a grid numbering system and the introduction of the blue and red shield. The sign is inspired by the American Interstate sign. This was especially needed in light of the fact that many visitors would be flocking to Montreal by car for Expo 67. Montreal's Autoroute Décarie (A-15) and the Louis-Hippolyte Lafontaine Bridge–Tunnel were constructed for that very reason. The Autoroute des Cantons-de-l'Est (Eastern Townships Autoroute - A-10) opened in 1964, and its continuation, A-55 between Magog and Rock Island, opened in 1967, connecting with Interstate 91. What are now the A-20 (part of the Trans-Canada Highway) and the A-15 to New York (connecting with Interstate 87), originally built in the 1940s, were upgraded to expressway standards. The A-20 also connects with Highway 401 in Ontario. A-40 was extended out to Berthierville, and later to Trois-Rivières in the 1970s. Others include Autoroutes 25, 30 (southern beltway), 31, 35 (eventually connecting to Interstate 89), Autoroute Laurentienne (73), and 640 (an unfinished proposed northern beltway).

1970s

The 1970s also saw the completion of the Pierre Laporte Bridge in Quebec City, connecting the south shore of the Saint Lawrence River to the north. In addition to this, the A-73 was extended to Beauce, the A-20 was extended to Rivière-du-Loup, and the Chomedey Autoroute (A-13), the A-19 and the A-440 were constructed in Laval. Autoroutes were built (two sections of A-440, and A-740) and a few more planned in the Quebec City region, creating a dense web, which led to significant sprawl. In 1976, the Parti Québécois came to power, whose platform mandated an expansion of public transportation over the construction of more Autoroutes. Existing Autoroutes were extended (e.g., the A-40 was extended from Trois-Rivières to Quebec City) but no new Autoroutes were built.

The Autoroute des Laurentides, the Autoroute des Cantons-de-l'Est, the Autoroute de la Rive-Nord (North Shore Autoroute), and the A-13 were toll roads until the mid-1980s, when the toll barriers were removed and the province stopped collecting tolls from vehicles using the Autoroutes. The last toll booth was on the Champlain Bridge (A-10,A-15 and A-20). It was removed in 1990 because the Champlain Bridge is federal property and is thus not subject to provincial tolls.

2000s
In the 2000s, there were several high-profile failures and collapses around some Autoroutes, due to aging and crumbling infrastructure, including the Boulevard du Souvenir overpass collapse, De la Concorde overpass collapse, and most recently the Ville-Marie tunnel collapse. An online poll by Léger Marketing conducted shortly after the Viger tunnel collapse found that 88 percent of Montrealers are "worried" about the state of roads, bridges and tunnels in the city, with more than half of respondents saying they are downright "scared" to drive under an overpass (58 percent), on a bridge (54 per cent), or through a tunnel (53 per cent). McGill University's Saeed Mirza stated that ill-advised design choices and poor-quality concrete were used in the construction rush ahead of Expo '67 and the 1976 Olympics. In particular, the concrete used was permeable with lack of proper drainage, and these allowed chlorides from de-icing salts to corrode the steel reinforcements.

Main-class autoroutes

Spur Class Autoroutes

See also

 Freeway (Canada)
 Highway
 List of Quebec provincial highways
 List of unbuilt autoroutes of Quebec
 Toll road
 Transports Québec
 100-Series Highways (Nova Scotia) (not to be confused with Quebec's highway system that sets itself apart from the Autoroutes)
 400-series highways (Ontario)
 400-series highways (British Columbia) (former series)

References

Information on new A-730 and A-930 from MTQ's A-30 newsletter

External links
 Ministère des Transports du Québec (provincial transport ministry)
 motorways-exits.com: An unofficial guide to the Province of Quebec  Expressway system
 Steve Anderson's MontrealRoads.com
 Unofficial Autoroute 73 website
 Tripod autoroute web site

 
Lists of roads in Quebec